Sophie McKenzie is a British author of books for young adults. Many of her novels have won several awards, the most famous being Girl, Missing.  Others include Blood Ties and The Set Up. McKenzie writes full-time and lives in London. Her books have mainly been published by Simon & Schuster.

Biography 
McKenzie grew up in London, and became a journalist after university. After being made redundant from her job in 2003, she started a year long 'Writing for Children course' at the City Literary Institute in London. She finished her first novel, Girl, Missing at the beginning of 2005, it was then published by Simon & Schuster Children's Books in 2006.

Novels

Young Adult Fiction 

Falling Fast 
Burning Bright  
Casting Shadows  
Defy The Stars
Truth Or Dare

Second Series 
Split Second  
 Every Second Counts

Missing Series 
 Girl, Missing
 Sister, Missing
 Missing Me
 Boy Missing-world book day book 2022

The Medusa Project 
 The Set-Up 
 The Hostage 
 The Thief  (World Book Day Special)
 The Rescue 
 Hunted 
 Double Crossed  
 Hit Squad

Blood Series 
Blood Ties 
 Blood Ransom

All About Eve 
Six Steps To A Girl 
Three's A Crowd
The One & Only
Heyyyyy

Crime Fiction Novels 
Trust In Me 
Close My Eyes (2013) `According to WorldCat, in 1438 libraries as of January, 2014.

Other Fiction 
 The Fix 
Time Train To The Blitz
Arthur's Sword

Awards

Girl, Missing Series

Girl, Missing 

 Winner Richard and Judy Best Kids’ Books 2007 12+
 Winner of the RHCBA 2007 12+
 Winner of the John Lewis Solihull Book Award 2008
 Winner of the 2008 Sakura Medal Award given by the International School Libraries of Japan

Sister, Missing

Missing Me 

 Winner of the Ealing Readers Award 2013

Blood Ties Series

Blood Ties 

  Overall winner of the Red House Children's Book Award 2009 
 Winner of the North East Teenage Book Award 2010 
 Winner of the Southern Schools Book Award 2010
 Winner of the Warwickshire Book Award 2010
 Winner of the RED Book Award 2010

References

External links
 author bio on her web site

Year of birth missing (living people)
Living people
British writers of young adult literature